Archduchess Margaret of Austria (10 January 1480 – 1 December 1530) was Governor of the Habsburg Netherlands from 1507 to 1515 and again from 1519 to 1530. She was the first of many female regents in the Netherlands.

Childhood and life in France

Margaret was born on 10 January 1480 and named after her stepgrandmother, Margaret of York. She was the second child and only daughter of Maximilian of Austria (future Holy Roman Emperor) and Mary of Burgundy, co-sovereigns of the Low Countries. In 1482, her mother died and her three-year-old brother Philip the Handsome succeeded her as sovereign of the Low Countries, with her father as his regent.

The same year her mother died, King Louis XI of France signed the Treaty of Arras, whereby her father promised to give her hand in marriage to Louis' son, Dauphin Charles. The engagement took place in 1483. With Franche-Comté and Artois as her dowry, Margaret was transferred to the guardianship of Louis XI, who died soon after. She was raised as a fille de France and prepared for her future role as Queen of France.

Under the supervision of her governess Madame de Segré, and Charles' sister, regent of France Anne de Beaujeu, Margaret received a fine education alongside several noble children, amongst whom was Louise of Savoy.

Although their union was political, the young Margaret developed a genuine affection for Charles. However, he renounced the treaty in the autumn of 1491 and forcibly married Margaret's former stepmother Anne, Duchess of Brittany, for political reasons. The French court had ceased treating Margaret as their future queen but she could not return to her ex-stepmother's (Anne of Brittany) court until June 1493 after the Treaty of Senlis had been signed in May that year. She was hurt by Charles' actions and was left with a feeling of enduring resentment towards the House of Valois.

Marriages

Princess of Asturias

To achieve an alliance with Queen Isabella I of Castile and King Ferdinand II of Aragon, Maximilian started negotiating the marriage of their only son and heir, John, Prince of Asturias, to Margaret, as well as the marriage of their daughter Juana to Philip. Margaret left the Netherlands for Spain late in 1496. Her engagement to the Prince of Asturias seemed doomed when the ship carrying her to Spain hit a storm in the Bay of Biscay. In haste, she wrote her own epitaph should she not reach Spain: 

However, Margaret survived the storm, and according to the Calendar of State Papers, Spain, Volume 1, 1485–1509, in February 1497 her entire fleet still waited in Southampton in England for weather to clear up. Margaret actually married Prince John on 3 April 1497 in Burgos Cathedral. Tragically, John died of a fever after only six months, on 4 October. Margaret was left pregnant but gave birth to a premature stillborn daughter on 2 April 1498.
Margaret stayed in Spain until September 1499 before returning home. In meantime it was suggested that she should teach Catherine of Aragon French.

Duchess of Savoy

In 1501, Margaret married Philibert II, Duke of Savoy (1480–1504), whose realm played a decisive role in the rivalry between France and the Habsburgs in Italy on account of its strategic position in the Western Alps. They had a very stable relationship for those 3 years. When Margaret came to Savoy, the government was in the hands of René, Philibert's bastard brother. Margaret fought hard to strip away his powers and possessions, even involving Maximilian (as Holy Roman Emperor, he was overlord of Savoy) to nullify the letters that gave René legitimacy. René, being declared a traitor, took refuge in France and was welcomed by his half-sister Louise of Savoy, mother of Francis I. She then took hold of the government, while her husband focused on private hobbies like hunting (which she did share with him). She summoned councils, appointed officers, and when her brother Philip visited, she discussed and approved his plan regarding a continued reapproachement with France.

By 1504, however, Philibert died of pleurisy. Grief-stricken, Margaret threw herself out of a window, but was saved. After being persuaded to bury her husband, she had his heart embalmed so she could keep it with her forever. Her court historian and poet Jean Lemaire de Belges gave her the title "Dame de deuil" (Lady of Mourning).

Governor of the Habsburg Netherlands

Queen Isabella died in late 1504, and Philip and Juana went to Castile to claim the crown. After Philip's death, Charles was the new sovereign of the Low Countries, but he was young and alone. Juana could not return to act as regent because her unstable mental state and her Castilian subjects would not allow their ruler to abandon the kingdom. Preoccupied with German affairs, her father, ruler of the Holy Roman Empire Maximillian I, named Margaret governor of the Low Countries and guardian of Charles in 1507, along with her nieces Eleanor, Isabella and Mary. She became the only woman elected as its ruler by the representative assembly of Franche-Comté, with her title confirmed in 1509.

Some report that Margaret was considered a foreigner because of her childhood at the French court. According to Blockmans and others though, Margaret, Philip as well as Charles V were considered autochthonous; only Maximilian was always a foreigner. The Governess served as an intermediary between her father and her nephew's subjects in the Netherlands from her newly built palace at Mechelen. During a remarkably successful career, she broke new ground for women rulers.

In 1520, Charles made Margaret his governor-general in gratitude for her services. She was the only regent he ever re-appointed indefinitely from 1519 until her death in on 1 December 1530. 

Tupu Ylä-Anttila opines that Margaret acted as defacto queen consort in a political sense, first to her father and then Charles V, "absent rulers" who needed a representative dynastic presence that also complemented their characteristics. Her queenly virtues helped her to play the role of diplomat and peace-maker, as well as guardian and educator of future rulers, whom Maximilian called "our children" or "our common children" in letters to Margaret. This was a model that developed as part of the solution for the emerging Habsburg composite monarchy and would continue to serve later generations. As an older relative and former guardian, she had more power with Charles than with her father Maximilian, who treated her cordially but occasionally acted in a threatening manner.

Authors of The Promised Lands: The Low Countries Under Burgundian Rule, 1369–1530 credit Margaret with keeping the provinces together as well as fulfilling the demands for peace from the Netherlandish Estates. Despite Louis XII's attempts to regain control of certain territories and interfered in Guelders, Friesland and Liege, cooperation between the regent, the Privy Council and the Estates General maintained the integrity of the Burgundian inheritance.

Foreign policy

Margaret soon found herself at war with France over the question of Charles's requirement to pay homage to the French king for the County of Flanders (which was outside the Empire; and while a long-standing portion of the inherited Burgundian titles & provinces, legally still within France). In response, she persuaded Emperor Maximilian to end the war with King Louis XII. On November 1508, she journeyed to Cambrai to assist in the formation of the League of Cambrai, which ended (for a time) the possibility of a French invasion of the Low Countries, redirecting French attention to Northern Italy.

The Estates preferred to maintain peace with France and Guelders. But Charles of Egmont, the defacto lord of Guelders continued to cause trouble. In 1511, she made an alliance with England and besieged Venlo, but Charles of Egmont invaded Holland so the siege had to be lifted. When she asked her father (who had fought Guelders even without the Low Countries's help during the time of Philip, and then helped Philip to achieve his 1505 victory over Guelders) to come to help, he suggested to her that the Estates in the Low Countries should defend themselves, forcing her to sign the 1513 treaty with Charles, recognizing him as Duke of Guelders and Count of Zutphen. In 1514, he marched into Arnhem – a clear breach of the treaty. The Habsburg Netherlands would only be able to incorporate Guelders and Zutphen under Charles V.

According to James D. Tracy, Maximilian and Margaret were reasonable in demanding more stern measures against Guelders, but their critics in the Estates General (that had continuously voted against providing funds for wars against Guelders) and among the nobles naively thought that Charles of Egmont could be controlled by maintaining the peaceful relationship with the King of France, his patron. After Charles's brief personal rule (1514–1517), Margaret returned to witness Guelders's most stunning military success in decades, together with a horrible trail of destruction their Black Band mercenaries left through Friesland and Holland. Many of Charles V's Netherlands subjects, including leading Humanists like Erasmus and Hadrianus Barlandus unreasonably mistrusted their government, suspecting that princes (Maximilian, in particular) were concocting clever schemes just to expand the Habsburg dominion and extracting money (in fact, Maximilian also did hope to employ the wealth of the Low Countries to finance his projects elsewhere – he hardly succeeded though). The inaction of the experienced commander Rudolf von Anhalt during the sacking of the town of Tienen in Brabant, in particular, made Barlandus suspect a sinister motive (in reality, von Anhalt was ordered by Margaret to avoid direct engagement until he had more troops).

By 1512, she told her father that the Netherlands existed on peace and trade, and thus she would declare neutrality while using foreign armies and funds to wage wars. She played the key role in bringing together the participants of Holy League: the pope, the Swiss, Henry VIII, Ferdinand of Aragon and her father Maximilian (he joined the League only as Emperor, as not as guardian of his grandson Charles and thus, the Low Countries' neutrality was maintained). The league targeted France. The treaty also would not prevent the more adventurous Netherlands seigneurs from serving under Maximilian and Henry when they attacked the French later.

Following this strategy, in 1513, at the head of Henry VIII's army, Maximilian gained a victory against the French at the Battle of the Spurs, at little cost to himself or his daughter (in fact according to Margaret, the Low Countries got a profit of one million of gold from supplying the English army).
For the sake of his grandson Charles's Burgundian lands, he ordered Therouanne's walls to be demolished (the stronghold had often served as a backdoor for French interference in the Low Countries).

After Maximillian I's death in 1518, Margaret and young Charles (all of 18) began to negotiate the latter's election as Holy Roman Emperor despite the opposition of the papacy and France. The Governess instead supported her younger nephew Ferdinand. However, Charles refused to withdraw. Using a combination of diplomacy and bribery, Margaret played a crucial role in the election of Charles as Holy Roman Emperor in 1519, defeating the candidacy of King Francis I of France, who from this day forward became Charles' great rival in the struggle for pre-eminence in Europe.

As Emperor, Charles V inherited the long-running disputes with the Kings of France over possession of the Duchy of Milan and the Kingdom of Naples.  Though Charles preferred the Netherlands to many of his possessions, his many kingdoms (and many wars) required him to travel throughout Europe.  His great victory at Pavia over Francis I in 1525 (Battle of Pavia) in which he took the French King prisoner and then freed him in exchange for his sons as hostages, led once more to French invasion of the Low Countries.  Francis reneged on promises to renounce overlordship of Artois, Flanders and the Franche-Cômté, much less return the much-desired Burgundian core territory, the Duchy itself centered at Dijon (Duchy of Burgundy) as soon as he was safely back in France.

Once again, Margaret proved a remarkably capable ruler of the Netherlands, holding off the forces of the League of Cognac – i.e. the French (1526–29) and then negotiating the "Paix de Dames/ Ladies Peace". Journeying to Cambrai again, Margaret reunited with Louise of Savoy, her sister-in-law and mother of Francis I. They negotiated the end of a war that France could no longer sustain; the Habsburgs lost Burgundy proper forever, but France gave up its claims to legal overlordship of Flanders, Artois and the "Free County" of Burgundy (Franche-Comté).

Economy

Margaret had an aptitude for business, and maintained the prosperity of the Netherlands. She negotiated the restoration of Intercursus Magnus with England, which was favorable to the Flemish textile interests and brought huge profits. Because of the trade, industry and wealth of the regions and cities she oversaw, the Low Countries was an important source of income for the Imperial treasury.

In 1524, she signed a trade agreement with Frederick I of Denmark (the condition was that Holland would not support Christian II) that ensured the regular supply of grain into the Netherlands. Christian later managed to get the support from Charles V thanks to the efforts of his secretary Cornelis de Schepper, but Margaret refused to follow even Charles's order and insisted on placing the economical interests of the Netherlands above dynastic interests (Christian was the husband of Isabella of Austria, thus brother-in-law to Charles sister of Charles and nephew-in-law to Margaret).

Margaret provided funds and war supplies for her nephew's troops, especially against King Francis I of France and the German Protestants. In following years, Habsburg forces consolidated their hold over Tournai, Friesland, Utrecht, and Overijssel, which became part of the Netherlands.

Internal conflict
Although the Low Countries was not previously centralized, Margaret's reign was a period of relative peace for the Netherlands. The exception was the beginning of the Protestant Reformation, especially in the north. The first martyrs were burnt at the stake in 1523.

Patronage of the arts

Once she was declared Governor of the Netherlands, Margaret purchased the Hof van Savoye, located in the Korte Maagdenstraat (Short Virgins Street) in Mechelen. She found the residence too small and started an ambitious expansion campaign in 1507. From 1517 to 1530, the architect Rombout II Keldermans furthered the project along the Keizerstraat (Emperor Street) and modified what became the rear wing, which faces the Palace of Margaret of York. The Governess kept several painters at her court, including the Master of the Legend of the Magdalen and Pieter van Coninxloo.

Margaret possessed a rich library, consisting mostly of missals, poetry, historical and ethical treatises, which included the works of Christine de Pizan and the famous illuminated Très Riches Heures du duc de Berry. She possessed several Chansonniers which contained works by Josquin des Prez, Johannes Ockeghem, Jacob Obrecht and Pierre de la Rue, who was her favourite composer. In his 1517–1518 travel journal, Italian canon Antonio de Beatis described Margaret's highly decorated library for women. The books are all written in French and bound in velvet with silver-gilt clasps.

Margaret ended up raising her nephew and nieces in her palace. Her court was visited by the great humanists of her time, including Erasmus, Adrian of Utrecht (later Pope Adrian VI), and Heinrich Cornelius Agrippa. Agrippa dedicated his arguably feminist work "Declamation on the Nobility and Preeminence of the Female Sex" to her. The Governor was so impressed with diplomat Thomas Boleyn's charm that she offered his daughter Anne Boleyn (future Queen consort of England) a temporary place in her household. She reported to the English nobleman that the little girl was "so presentable and so pleasant, considering her youthful age, that I am more beholden to you for sending her to me, than you to me."

Margaret ordered several splendid music manuscripts from Pierre Alamire to send them as gifts to her relatives and political relations. She had one of the earliest collections of objects from the New World. Hernán Cortés had presented Charles V with treasures received from the Aztec King Moctezuma in 1519. Several of these treasures were sent to Mechelen as a gift from her nephew in 1523.

Portraits

Death and Burial

On 15 November 1530, Margaret stepped on a piece of broken glass. She initially thought little of the injury but gangrene set in and the leg had to be amputated. She decided to arrange all her affairs first, designating Charles V as her sole heir and writing him a letter in which she asked him to maintain peace with France and England. On the night of 30 November, the doctors came to operate on her. They gave her a dose of opium to lessen the pain, but it was reportedly so strong that she would not wake up again. She died between midnight and one o'clock.

She was buried alongside her second husband at Bourg-en-Bresse, in the mausoleum of the Royal Monastery of Brou that she previously commissioned. There is a statue of the Governess next to the St. Rumbold's Cathedral in Mechelen, Belgium.

Heraldry

Depiction in media
Margaret of Austria is portrayed by Spanish actress Úrsula Corberó in the TV show Isabel.

A fictionalized version of Margaret can be found in the play The Unhappy Penitent by Catharine Trotter, where she appears as the character 'Margarite'. In the play, Margarite is in love with René II, Duke of Lorraine, although this may be a historical inaccuracy since there is no indication available today that the two ever met. Also, the Duke of Brittany is in love with Margarite, but this likely another historical inaccuracy since he died in 1488, three years before Anne came to France to marry Charles VIII; her father's death is what spurred the various betrothals of Anne.

In the  White Princess series she is portrayed by  Zazie Hayhurst.

Ancestry

References

Bibliography

Margarete – Maximilian I. Musik um 1500, Capilla Flamenca with La Caccia, Schola Cantorum Cantate Domino Aalst, Schola Gregoriana Lovaniensis, 1998, ORF Shop CD 265 (2 CDs).
Dulcis Melancholia, Biographie musicale de Marguerite d'Autriche, Capilla Flamenca, 2005 (MEW 0525).
Dame de Deuil. Musical Offerings for Marguerite of Austria,  La Morra, 2005 (KTC 4011).

 
 

 Margaret of Austria (1480–1530) Encyclopedia

|-

1480 births
1530 deaths
15th-century House of Habsburg
16th-century House of Habsburg
Austrian princesses
Austrian Roman Catholics
Princesses of Asturias
House of Trastámara
16th-century women rulers
Duchesses of Savoy
Governors of the Habsburg Netherlands
Daughters of emperors
Daughters of kings
Female governors-general